Mark W. Pawelek (born August 18, 1986) is an American former professional baseball pitcher. 

He was drafted by the Chicago Cubs in the 1st round (20th overall pick) round of the 2005 Major League Baseball Draft. Pawelek attended Springville High School and signed with the Cubs and received a $1.75 million signing bonus instead of accepting a scholarship offer to play college baseball at Arizona State University. He played in the Cubs minor league system from 2005 to 2009, and never reached the major leagues. In 2010, he played independent baseball for the Gateway Grizzlies of the Frontier League. Pawelek played for Team Netherlands in the 2013 World Baseball Classic.

References

External links

1986 births
Living people
People from Springville, Utah
Baseball players from Utah
Baseball pitchers
Minor league baseball players
Arizona League Cubs players
Boise Hawks players
Peoria Chiefs players
Sarasota Reds players
Gateway Grizzlies players
2013 World Baseball Classic players
2017 World Baseball Classic players